There are many synonyms in Japanese because the Japanese language draws from several different languages for loanwords, notably Chinese and English, as well as its own native words.  In Japanese, synonyms are called dōgigo (kanji: 同義語) or ruigigo (kanji: 類義語).

Full synonymy, however, is rare. In general, native Japanese words may have broader meanings than those that are borrowed, Sino-Japanese words tend to suggest a more formal tone, while Western borrowed words more modern.

Yamato kotoba vs. kango vs. gairaigo 
The table below compares native Japanese words, inherited from Old Japanese – yamato kotoba – with words borrowed from Chinese – kango – and loanwords from other languages – gairaigo.

Native synonyms

References 

Lexical semantics
Japanese vocabulary